This list of Inner Hebrides summarises a chain of islands and skerries located off the west coast of mainland Scotland. There are 36 inhabited islands in this archipelago, of which Islay, Mull and Skye are the largest and most populous.

The islands of Scotland's west coast are known collectively as the Hebrides; the Inner Hebrides are separated from the Outer Hebrides by The Minch to the north and the Sea of the Hebrides to the south. The Inner Hebrides that lie respectively north and south of Ardnamurchan are administered by two separate local authorities as part of larger territories. The northern Inner Hebrides, including Skye, the Small Isles and the Summer Isles, are part of the Highland unitary council region. The southern group, including Islay, Jura, the Slate Islands and Gigha are part of the Argyll and Bute council region.

In the past, the Hebrides as a whole were a strong Scottish Gaelic-speaking area, and in 1921 more than 50% of the populations of most of these islands, including Skye, Mull and Islay, were proficient in the language. However, although the Outer Hebrides have retained many Gaelic speakers, in the 2001 census only Skye (31%) and Tiree (48%) had more than 25% of the resident population able to speak Gaelic; Mull, Jura, Gigha and Coll each recorded figures of less than 15%.

The modern economy centres on tourism, crofting, farming, fishing, and whisky distilling. The archipelago is exposed to wind and tide. There are numerous lighthouses as an aid to navigation.

There are various descriptions of the scope of the Hebrides. The Collins Encyclopedia of Scotland describes the Inner Hebrides as lying "east of The Minch", which would include any and all offshore islands. There are various islands that lie in the sea lochs, such as Eilean Bàn and Eilean Donan, that might not ordinarily be described as "Hebridean", but no formal definition exists and for simplicity they are included in this list rather than elsewhere.

Etymology
Various Gaelic names are used repeatedly. The suffix ay or aigh or aidh is generally from the Norse øy meaning "island". Eilean (plural: eileanan) also means "island". Beag and mòr (also bheag and mhòr) mean "little" and "big" and are often found together. Sgeir is "skerry" and often refers to a rock or rocks that lie submerged at high tide. Dubh is "black", dearg is "red" and glas means "grey" or "green". Orasaigh is from the Norse Örfirirsey meaning "tidal" or "ebb island".

Inhabited islands

The inhabited islands of the Inner Hebrides had a population of 18,257 in 2001, and 18,948 at the time of the 2011 census. The highest peaks of the islands have names deriving from both Gaelic and Old Norse, indicating the historical importance of these two cultures. The archaeological record for the period of Viking domination during the Early Historic period is, however, limited.

In the Outer Hebrides all of the inhabited islands are now connected to at least one other island by a land transport route, but only four Inner Hebridean islands are connected by road, all to the mainland. The Clachan Bridge from Argyll to Seil was designed by Thomas Telford and dates from 1792. Skye has been connected to Kyle of Lochalsh by the Skye Bridge since 1995. Danna is also connected to the Tayvallich peninsula in Argyll by a stone causeway; and tiny Eilean Donan, dominated by its castle, has had a connection to the mainland perhaps from as early as the 13th century. The arched bridge in use today was constructed in the early 20th century.

Lunga in the Firth of Lorn had a population of 7, Eilean Bàn a population of 2 and Eilean Donan a single resident in 2001 but none recorded a usually resident population in 2011.

Castle Stalker, Eilean Horrisdale, Eilean Loain and Inch Kenneth are "included in the NRS statistical geography for inhabited islands but had no usual residents at the time of either the 2001 or 2011 censuses".

Uninhabited islands

There are 43 uninhabited Inner Hebrides with an area greater than 30 hectares (approximately 74 acres). Records for the last date of settlement for the smaller uninhabited islands are incomplete, but most of the islands listed here would have been inhabited at some point during the Neolithic, Iron Age, Early Historic or Norse periods.

In common with the other main island chains of Scotland many of the more remote islands were abandoned during the 19th and 20th centuries, in some cases after continuous habitation since prehistoric times. These places had been perceived as relatively self-sufficient agricultural economies, but both island residents and outsiders later came to consider that the more remote islands lacked the essential services of a modern industrial economy.

Some of the islands continue to contribute to modern culture. Staffa came to prominence in the late 18th century after a visit by Sir Joseph Banks. He and his fellow travellers extolled the natural beauty of the basalt columns in general, and in particular of the island's main sea cavern, which Banks renamed "Fingal's Cave". Many other prominent personalities visited Staffa over the next two centuries, including Felix Mendelssohn, whose Hebrides Overture brought further fame to the island. During the Second World War, Gruinard was the site of a biological warfare test by British military scientists. At that time there was an investigation by the British government to test both the vulnerability of Britain to attack and the possibility of attacking Germany using anthrax.

The difficulties of definition are considerable in some cases. For example, Haswell-Smith (2004) treats Lunga as a single island, although during high tides it becomes one inhabited island and numerous uninhabited tidal islets. Another example is the smaller island of Eilean Mòr in Loch Dunvegan, which joins with nearby Eilean Dubh and Garay Island at low tides.

Smaller islets and skerries

Smaller islands, tidal islets only separated at higher stages of the tide, and skerries which are only exposed at lower stages of the tide pepper the seas surrounding the main islands. Many of them are obscure and only a few have ever been inhabited. Nonetheless, some have a significant degree of notability. Lady's Rock, a skerry in Loch Linnhe, was the site of the attempted murder of Lady Catherine Campbell by her husband Lachlan Maclean of Duart in 1527. He rowed out to the rock one night at low tide and left his wife stranded on the rock to die. Nearby Castle Stalker was in the possession of Clan Stewart of Appin  at this time, but its more recent claim to fame is as a location in the film Monty Python and the Holy Grail.

Remote Dubh Artach and Skerryvore are the sites of two unmanned lighthouses; the latter reaches  in height and is the tallest in the United Kingdom. Belnahua supported a population of slate workers in its substantial and now flooded central quarry during the 19th century.
Nearby Eilean-a-beithich once stood in the Easdale Sound between Easdale and Seil. This was eventually swept away by the sea and little visible sign of the island now remains.

In addition to being a hazard to navigation, the Torran Rocks south of Erraid are one of the locations featured in the novel Kidnapped by Robert Louis Stevenson. It was here that Alan Breck Stewart and David Balfour were ship-wrecked.

The smaller Inner Hebridean islands, grouped by location (from south to north), in the vicinity of:

South Argyll Coast

Kintyre: Mull, Scart Isle, The Merchants
Gigha: Còrr Eilean, Craro, Eilean á Chuill, Eilean Leim, Eilean Liath, Eilean na h-Aird, Eilean na h-Uilinn, Gamhna Giogha, Gigalum
Cara: Coire Cara, Sgeir à Bhuntata, Sgeir Buideil
West Loch Tarbert: Eilean Ceann na Creige, Eilean da Ghallagain, Eilean Eòghainn, Eilean nan Craobh, Eilean Traighe
Loch Stornoway: Carriag Mhaidean, Eilean Clach nan Uamhannan, Sgeir Choigreach
Loch Caolisport: Eilean Fada, Eilean na h-Uamhaidh, Eilean nam Muc, Eilean Naomhachd, Glas Eilean, Liath Eilein
MacCormaig Isles: Corr Eilean, Eilean Ghamna, Eilean Mòr, Eilean nan Leac, Eilean Puirt Leithe
Loch Sween: Cala, Eilean Loain, Eilean Mhartan, Eilean na Circe, Taynish Island, Ulva Islands
Danna: Eilean à Chapuill, Eilean nan Uan, Liath Eilean
Fairy Islands: Eilean a' Bhrein
West Taynish: Carsaig Island, Eilean Dubh, Eilean Fraoich, Eilean nan Coinean, Eilean Traighe, Leth Sgeir, Ruadh Sgeir
Loch Crinan: An-unalin, Black Rock, Eilean Glas, Eilean nan Coinean
Loch Craignish: Eilean na Cille, Eilean na-h Eairne, Garbh Rèisa, Sgeir na Maoile
Eilean Macaskin: Liath-sgeir Bheag, Liath-sgeir Mhòr
Eilean Mhic Chrion: Eilean Buidhe, Eilean Dubh, Eilean Inshaig, Eilean na Nighinn, Eilean Traighte
Eilean Rìgh: Eilean nan Gabhar,
West Craignish: Coiresa, Creagach Chrosgach, Culbhaic, Eilean Ona, Reisa an t-Sruith, Reisa Mhic Phaidean
Craobh Haven: Eich Donna, Eilean an Duin, Eilean Arsa, Eilean Buidhe, Eilean Creagach, Fraoch Eilean, Liath Sgeir
Loch Melfort: Eilean Coltair, Eilean Gamhna, Scoul Eilean

Islay group

Islay:
Mull of Oa and Laggan Bay: Eileanan Mòra, Sgeirean Buidhe Ghil
Loch Indaal: Carraig Dhubh
Rinns of Islay: Am Ballan, Eilean Liath, Eilean Mhic Coinnich, Frenchman's Rocks, Orsay, Sgeiran Dubha
North west coast: Boghachan Mòra, Eilean an Tannais-sgeir, Eilean Beag, Eilean Mòr, Nave Island, Post Rocks
East coast: Eilean Liath
Kildalton:  Ceann nan Sgieran, Eilean á Chùirn, Eilean an Droighinn, Eilean Bhride, Eilean Craobhach, Eilean Mhic Mhaolmhoire, Outram, Sgeir nam Ban
Ardbeg: Carmichael's Rocks, Cleit Buidhe, Corr Sgeir, Eilean an t-Sluic, Eilean Imersay,  Iseanach Beag, Iseanach Mòr
Carraig Fhada: Am Plodan, An Gànradh, Eilean nan Caorach, Sgeir Fhada, Sgeir Phlocach
Colonsay: Eilean à Chladaich, Eilean Dubh, Eilean na Brathan, Eilean Leathann, Eilean Mhártain, Eilean na Bilearach, Eilean nam Ban, Eilean nam Feannaig, Eilean Olmsa, Glas Eilean
Jura:
East coast: Eilean à Bhorra, Eilean an Rubha, Eilean Buidhe Mòr, Eilean na h-Aorinn, Eilean Traigh an Airgid, Liath Eilean, Na Cuiltean
Small Isles: Eilean Bhride, Eilean Diomhain, Eilean nan Coinnean, Eilean nan Gabhar, Pladda
Sound of Islay: Am Fraoch Eilean, Brosdale Island, Glas Eilean
Loch Tarbert: Eilean an Easbuig, Eilean Ard, Eilean Dubh à Cumhainn Bhig, Eilean Dubh à Cumhainn Mhoir, Eileanan Gleann Righ, Eilean Iosal
West coast: Eilean Beag, Eilean Mòr, Shian Island
Oronsay: Dubh Eilean, Eileanan à Chuir, Eilean Ghaoideamal, Eilean Mhic Iain Ruaidh, Eilean Mhugaig, Eilean nam Uan, Eilean nan Ron
Scarba: Eilean à Bhealach, Eilean Ard, Sgeiran à Mhaoil, Sgeir nan Gobhar
Texa: Sgeiran an Lòin, Tarr Sgeir

Firth of Lorn

Slate Islands:
Easdale:  None
Eilean Dubh Mòr: Eilean Dubh Beag, Liath Sgeir, Sgeir à Gheòidh, Sgeir nan Taod
Insh: Dubh-sgeir, Eilean Bàn-leac
Luing: Diar Sgeir, Dubh-fheith, Dubh Sgeir, Eilean Loisgte, Fraoch Eilean (2), Funaich Mhòr, Glas Eilean, Rubh Aird Luing, Sgeir Bhuidhe
Lunga: An Tudan, Belnahua,  Eilean Ioasal, Eilean nan Ceann, Fiola an Droma, Fiola Meadhonach, Fladda, Guirasdeal, Liath Sgeir, Ormsa, Rubha Fiola, Sgeir Mhic an Altair, Sgeir Poll nan Corran
Torsa: Eilean Fraoch, Glas Eilean
Seil: Eilean à Chomraidh, Eilean Buidhe, Eilean Dùin, Eilean nam Beathach, Eilean nam Freumha, Eilean Tornal, Henderson's Rock,
Shuna: None
Garvellachs:
Eileach an Naoimh: Sgeiran Dubha, Sgeir Leth à Chuain
Garbh Eileach: À Chùli,  Dùn Chonnuill

Loch Linnhe

Loch Feochan: Eilean an Ruisg
Kerrera: Bach Island, Eilean nan Gamhna, Eilean nan Uan, Eilean Orasaig, Heather Island, Maiden Island, Rubh'a Cruidh,  Sgeir à Gheòidh
Loch Etive: Abbot's Isle, Eilean Beag, Eilean Mòr, Eilean nam Meann, Eilean Traighe, Kilmaronag Islands
Eriska: Glas Eilean, Sgeir Caillich,
Lismore: Bernera Island, Branra, Creag Island, Eilean Dubh (2), Eilean Loch Oscair, Eilean Musdile, Eilean na Cloich, Eilean nam Bàn, Eilean nam Meann, Eilean nan Caorach, Eilean nan Chaorainn, Eilean nan Gamhna, Eilean Ramsay, Inn Island, Lady's Rock, Pladda Island,
Shuna: Eilean Balnagowan, Castle Stalker
Loch Leven: Eilean à Chòmraidh, Eilean Coinneach, Eilean Munde, Eilean nam Ban
Loch Eil: Eilean à Bhealaidh, Eilean na Creich, Eilean  nan Craobh, Rubha Dearg

Mull group

Coll: A' Chairidhe, Airne na Sgeire, An Glas-eilean, Eag na Maoile, Eilean an Eith, Eilean an t-Sean Chaisteil, Eilean Ascaoineach, Eilean Bhoramuil, Eilean Bhuigistile, Eilean Dubh, Eilean Eatharna, Eilean Halum, Eilean Iomallach, Eilean Mòr, Eilean na Bà, Eilean nam Muc, Eilean Odhar, Eilean Ornsay, Eilean Tomaluam, Soa, Sùil Ghorm
Eorsa: None
Gometra: Eilean Dioghlum, Màisgier
Gunna: Eilean nam Maidean, Eilean nan Gamhna
Iona: Corr Eilean, Eilean Annraidh, Eilean Chalbha Eilean Didil, Eilean Musimul, Eilean na h-Aon Chaorach, Reidh Eilean, Soa Island, Stac an Aoineidh, Stac Mhic Muhurchaidh
Inch Kenneth: Samalan Island
Little Colonsay: None
Mull:
Calve Island: Cnap à Chailbe, Eilean na Beithe
Sound of Mull: Am Brican, Dearg Sgeir, Eileanan Bàna, Eileanan Glasa, Eilean Bàn
Loch Don: Eilean Bàn, Eilean a' Mhadaidh, Eileanan nan Caorach
Loch Spelve: Eilean Amalaig
Loch Buie: Eilean Mòr, Eilean Uamh Ghuaidhre, Frank Lockwood's Island
Ross of Mull south: Eilean à Chròtha, Eilean Imheir, Eilean Liath, Eilean Mòr, Eilean Nam Boc, Eilean nan Caorann, Gamhnach Mhòr, Garbh Eilean, Na Minn, Na Maoil Mhòra
Erraid: Am Baister, Eilean a' Chalmain, Eilean Dubh (2), Eilean Ghomain, Eilean nam Muc, Eilean na Seamair, Livingston's Rocks, Rankin's Rocks, Sgeir à Chobhain, Sgeir na Caillich
Torran Rocks: Dearg Sgeir, MacPhail's Anvil, Na Torrain, Torran Sgoilte, Torr an t-Saothaid
Sound of Iona: Eilean à Ghearrain, Eilean Dubh, Eilean Dubh na Ciste, Eilean  Gainmheinich, Eilean nam Ban, Liath Eilean
Loch na Làthaich: Eilean an Fheòir, Eilean Bàn, Na Liathanaich
Loch Scridain: Eilean nan Caorach, Sgeir Leathan
Ardmeanach: Eilean Dubh Cruinn, Erisgeir
Loch na Keal: Eilean Casach, Eilean Feòir,
Mishnish: Cuan Mòr, Eilean an Tairt, Eilean nan Gabhar
Staffa: Am Buchaille
Tiree: Ceann  Mòr, Chreachasdal Mòr, Eilean Ghreasamuill (2), Eilean Ghreusgain, Eilean nan Siolag, Eilean Shomhairle, Fadamull, Rubha Liath, Sgeir Mhòr, Soa
Lunga: Bac Beag, Bac Mòr, Cairn na Burgh Beag, Cairn na Burgh Mòr, Fladda, Sgeir an Eirionnaich, Sgeir a' Chaisteil
Ulva: Eilean à Bhuic, Eilean à Chaolais, Eilean an Dusain, Eilean an Righ, Eilean na Creiche, Eilean na h-Uamha, Eilean Reilean, Garbh Eilean, Geasgill Beag, Geasgill Mòr, Sgeir Feòir, Trealbhan
Outliers: Dubh Artach, Skerryvore

Small Isles

Canna: Alman, An Stéidh, Eilean à Bhaird, Haslam
Eigg:  Eilean Chathastail, Eilean Thuilm
Muck: Eagamol, Eilean nan Each
Rùm: None
Sanday: Dùn Mòr
Outliers: Garbh Sgeir,  Humla, Hyskeir

North Argyll coast
From Ininmore Bay in Morvern to the River Sheil.
Sound of Mull: Eilean na Beitheiche, Eilean Rubha an Ridire, Glas Eileanan, Sgeir Chorrach
Loch Sunart: Dun Ghallain, Eilean an t-Sionnaich, Eilean à Chuilinn, Eilean à Mhuirich, Eilean Mòr, Eilean mo Shlinneag, Garbh Eilean, Glas Eilean
Càrna: Eilean an Fheidh, Eilean nan Eildean, Eilean nan Gabhar, Eilean nan Gad, Risga
Oronsay: Eilean Mòr, Sligneach Mòr
Ardnamurchan:
South coast: Eilean nan Seachd Seisrichean, Glas Eilean
North coast: Eilean Carrach, Eilean Chaluim Cille, Eilean Dubh, Eilean na h-Acairseid, Sanna Island, Sgeir à Chàm Eilein, Sgeir an Eididh, Sgeir an Rathaid, Sgeir nam Meann
Kentra Bay: Eilean an Eididh Eilean Dhònuill, Eilean Dubh, Eilean Loisgte, Eilean nan Gad

South Highland coast

Eilean Shona: An Glas-eilean, Eilean à Choire, Eilean an Feheidh, Eilean an t-Sabhail, Eilean Coille, Eilean Dubh,  Eilean Mhic Neill, Eilean Raonuill, Eilean Tioram, Eilean Uaine, Riska
Sound of Arisaig:
Loch Ailort: Eilean à Bhuic, Eilean à Chaolais, Eilean Buidhe, Eilean Dubh, Eilean Dubh an Aonaich, Eilean na Gualinn, Eilean nam Bairneach, Eilean nan Gabhar, Eilean nan Trom, Samalaman Island, Sgeir Glas
Loch nan Uamh: Am Fraoch-eilean, An Garbh-eilean, An Glas-eilean, Còrr Eilean, Eilean à Ghaill, Eilean Aird nam Bùth, Eilean an t-Snidhe, Eilean Ceann Fèidh, Eilean Gobhlach, Eilean nan Cabar, Eilean Port nam Murrach
Eilean Ighe: Am Fraoch-eilean, Eilean Ban, Luinga Beag, Luinga Mhòr
North Arisaig coast: An Glas-eilean, Bogh' Oitir,  Rubha dà Chuain, Sgeirean na Corra-gribhich
Morar Bay: Eilean Ruadh, Eilean Toigal
Mallaig: Eilean na h-Acairseid
Loch Nevis: An Corr-eilean, Eilean Giubhais, Eilean Maol, Eilean na Glaschoille,
West Knoydart coast: Airor Island, Eilean an t-Sionnach, Eilean Dearg, Eilean na Gàmhna, Eilean Shamadalain, Glas Eilean, Sgeir Glas
Loch Hourn: Corr Eileanan, Eilean à Chuilinn, Eilean à Gharb-Iain, Eilean à Mhuineil, Eilean à Phiobaire, Eilean Chamas nan Doth, Eilean Chlamial, Eilean Choinnich, Eilean Mhartain, Eilean Mhogh-sgeir, Eilean Ràrsaidh, Eilean Tioram, Fraoch Eilean, Glas Eilean
Sandaig Islands: An Gurraban, Eilean Carach, Eilean Mòr Fraoich Eilean

Skye group

Crowlin Islands:
Eilean Mòr: None
Eilean Meadhonach: Eilean Beag, 
Eilean Bàn: None
Eilean Trodday: None
Isay: Clett, Mingay
Longay: None
Pabay: None
Raasay: Eilean Aird nan Gobhar, Eilean an Inbhire, Holoman Island, Manish Island
Eilean Fladday: Fraoch Eilean, Glas Eilean, Griana-sgeir
Eilean Tigh: Eilean an Fhraoich
Rona: Cow Rock, Eilean Garbh, Eilean Seamraig, Garbh Eilean, Sgeirean Buidhe Borlum, Sgeir Shuas
Scalpay: Eilean Leac na Gainimh, Guillamon Island, Sgeir Dhearg
Skye:
Sleat: Eilean Dubh, Eilean Ruairidh, Eilean Sgorach
Ornsay: Eilean an Eòin, Eilean Sionnach
Strathaird: Eilean na h-Àirde
Minginish: An Dubh-sgeir, Eilean Glas, Eilean Reamhar, Stac à Mheadais
Loch Bracadale:  Oronsay, Sula Skerry, Tarner Island
Harlosh Island: None
Duirinish: An Dubh Sgeir, An Stac, Macleod's Maidens
Loch Dunvegan: Carraig Shleamhuinn, Eilean Dubh, Eilean Dubh Beag, Eilean Glas, Eilean Grianal, Eilean Mòr, Eilean na h-Eigheach, Eilean Traigh, Garay Island, Garbh Eilean, Lampay
Waternish: Caisteal an Fhithich
Loch Snizort: Eilean Beag, Eilean Mòr
Ascrib Islands: Eilean Creagach, Eilean Garave, Eilean Iosal, Sgeir à Chapuill, Sgeir à Chuin, South Ascrib
Trotternish: An t-Iasgair, Eilean Chaluim-chille, Eilean Flodigarry,  Holm Island, Sgeir na Eireann, Staffin Island, Tulm Island,
Fladda-chùain group: Fladaigh Chuain, Gaeilavore Island, Gearran, Lord MacDonald's Table (Am Bord), The Cleats, Thon Eilean
Broadford Bay: Eilean na Ruadhaich, Glas Eilean, Sgeir Dubh
Loch Alsh: Sgeir na Caillich
Soay: Na Gamhnaichean
Wiay: None

North Highland coast

Wester Ross:
Loch Alsh: Glas Eilean
Loch Long: À Ghlas-sgeir, Sheep Island
Eilean Donan: Eilean Tioram
Loch Duich: Am Fraoch-eilean
Kyle of Lochalsh: Black Islands, Eilean à Mhal, Eileanan Dubha, Eilean na Crèadha, Eilean nan Gobhar Beag,  Eilean nan Gobhar Mòr
Loch Carron: An Garbh-Eilean, Eilean an-t-Sratha, Eilean Glasiach, Eilean na Beinne, Eilean na Creige Duibhe, Eilean nan Fraoich, Eilean nan Stac,  Kishorn Island, Sgeir Bhuidhe, Sgeir Fhada, Strome Islands,
Plockton: À Ghlas-leac, An Garbh-Eilean, Eilean à Bhata, Eilean à Chait, Eilean an Duine, Eilean Dubh, Eilean Dubh Dhurinis, Eilean Lagach, Eilean na Bà Beag, Eilean na Bà Mòr, Eilean nam Fiadh, Eilean na Sgeir-Feor, Eilean nan Gamhainn, Eilean Stacan, Eilean Sgreabach, Sgeir Bhuidhe
Inner Sound: An Ruadh-Eilean, Eilean Chuaig, Eilean na Bà, Eilean nan Naomh,
Loch Torridon: Eilean à Chaoil, Eilean an Inbhire Bhàin, Eilean Dùghaill, Eilean Mòr, Eilean Tioram, Sgeir Ghlas,  Sgeir na Trian, Shieldaig Island
Eilean Horrisdale: Eilean Tioram, Sgeir Glas
Gairloch: Eilean an t-Sabhail, Eilean Shieldaig, Fraoch-eilean, Glas Eilean, Na Dùnain
Longa Island: None
Rubha Rèidh: An Sean Sgeir, Stac Buidhe, Stac Dubh
Isle of Ewe: Boor Rocks, Eilean Furadh Beag, Eilean Furadh Mòr, Sgeir an Araig, Sgeir Maol Mhoraidh, Sgeir Maol Mhoraidh Shuas, Stac Ruadh
Gruinard: Fraoch, Eilean Beag, Fraoch Eilean Mòr
Summer Isles:
Horse Island: Càrn nan Sgeir, Meall nan Caorach, Meall nan Gabhar
Isle Martin: None
Isle Ristol: Bò Bhùiridh, Eilean Glas, Eilean Mullagrach
Priest Island: Bottle Island, Carn Deas, Carn Iar, Eilean Dubh, Glas-leac Beag, Sgeirean Glasa, Sgeir nam Mult
Tanera Beag: Eilean à Chàr, Eilean Choinaid, Eilean Fada Beag, Eilean Fada Mòr, Glas-leac Mòr, Sgeir an Aon Iomairt, Sgeir Loisgte, Sgeir nam Feusgan, Sgeir Ribhinn, Stac Mhic Aonghais
Tanera Mor: Eilean à Bhuic, Eilean Beag, Eilean Mòr, Eilean na Saille
Enard Bay: À Chleit, Eilean Mòineseach, Eilean Mòr, Fraochlan, Green Island, Rubha à Bhrocaire, Sgeir Bhuidhe, Sgeir Ghlas Bheag,  Sgeir Ghlas Mhòr, Sgeir nam Boc
Sutherland:

Loch Inver: Glas Leac, Soyea Island
Stoer: Old Man of Stoer
Oldany:  Bogh' an Tairbh, Eilean Chrona, Eilean na Ligheach, Eilean nam Boc, Eilean nan Gobhar, Eilean nan Uan, Mòr Eilean, Sgeir nan Gall
Eddrachillis Bay: An Calbh, Eilean à Bhuic, Eilean Rairidh, Meall Beag, Meall Mòr, Sgeir à Chlaidheimh
Badcall Bay: Dubh Sgeir,  Eilean à Bhreitheimh,  Eilean Garbh, Eilean na Bearachd, Eilean na Rainich, Eilean Riabhach, Glas Leac, Meall Earca, Ox Rock
Loch a' Chàirn Bhàin: Eilean à Ghamhna, Eilean na Furaradh, Eilean na Rainich, Garbh Eilean
Loch Glencoul: Creag Bàgh an Liath Bhaid, Eilean à Chon' à Chreige, Eilean à Chumhainn, Eilean an Tighe, Eilean an Tuim, Eilean Àrd, Eilean na Moine
Loch Dhrombaig: Cul Eilean, Eilean an Achaidh, Sgeir Liath,
Handa: Eilean an Aigeich, Glas Leac, Sgeirean Glasa
Loch Laxford: Dubh Sgeirean, Eilean à Chadh-fi, Eilean à Mhadaidh, Eileanan Dubha, Eilean an Eireannaich, Eilean an t-Sithein, Eilean Àrd, Eilean Dubh an Teoir, Eilean Dubh na Fionndalach Bige, Eilean Dubh nam Boc, Eilean Meall à Chaorainn, Eilean na Carraig, Eilean na Saille, Eilean Port à Choit, Glas Leac, Rubh' à Cheathraimh Ghairbh,  Sgeirean Cruaidhe, Sgeir Eorna, Sgeir Fhanda, Sgeir Iosal, Sgeir Ruadh
Kinlochbervie:  Eilean à Chonnaidh, Eilean Dubh,  Glas Leac, Na Clusnadh
Eilean an Ròin Mòr: Dubh Sgeir, Eilean an Ròin Beag, Eilean na h-Aiteg, Na Stacan, Seana Sgeir
Sandwood Bay and Cape Wrath: Am Balg, Am Bodach, Am Buchaille, Goedha Ruadh na Fola

Small archipelagos

There are various small island groups within the Inner Hebrides that are included above. The largest of these mini-archipelagos are:
 The Ascrib Islands in Loch Snizort off the northwest coast of Skye.
 The Crowlin Islands in the Inner Sound between Skye and Applecross.
 The Garvellachs north of Scarba in the Firth of Lorne.
 The MacCormaig Isles off Kintyre south of Danna.
 The Sandaig Islands south of Glenelg in the Sound of Sleat.
 The Slate Islands north of Jura and southwest of Oban.
 The Small Isles south of Skye and west of Mallaig.
 The Summer Isles in Loch Broom northwest of Ullapool.
 The Treshnish Isles west of Mull and north of Iona.

There is another group of islets off Craighouse on the east coast of Jura called the Small Isles.

See also

 Rathlin Island
 List of Outer Hebrides
 List of islands of Scotland
 List of islands of the British Isles

References and footnotes
General references
 Baird, Bob (1995) Shipwrecks of the West of Scotland. Glasgow. Nekton Books. 
 
 Hunter, James (2000) Last of the Free: A History of the Highlands and Islands of Scotland. Edinburgh. Mainstream. 
 Keay, J. & Keay, J. (1994) Collins Encyclopaedia of Scotland. London. HarperCollins.
 
 Maclean, Charles (1977) Island on the Edge of the World: the Story of St. Kilda. Edinburgh. Canongate. 
 
 Murray, W.H. (1973) The Islands of Western Scotland. London. Eyre Methuen. 

Notes

Citations

External links

Inner Hebrides